Tripoli Lake is a lake in the Nelson River drainage basin in Kenora District, northwestern Ontario, Canada and the source of Tripoli Creek.

See also
List of lakes in Ontario

References

Lakes of Kenora District